Yukhary-Uchkovakh is a village in the Agdash Rayon of Azerbaijan.

References
 

Populated places in Agdash District